Variegated Glacier is one of several glaciers which connect to Russell Fjord in Alaska.  Variegated Glacier has been of considerable scientific interest because it surges every 20 years.

See also
 List of glaciers

References 

Glaciers of Alaska
Glaciers of Yakutat City and Borough, Alaska